Stephen Bengo is a Uganda international football player.

Achievements

CECAFA Cup
Winner: 2008

References

Living people
Ugandan footballers
Uganda international footballers
Ugandan expatriate footballers
Association football midfielders
SC Villa players
2011 African Nations Championship players
Kampala Capital City Authority FC players
Ugandan expatriate sportspeople in Tanzania
Expatriate footballers in Tanzania
Year of birth missing (living people)
Sportspeople from Kampala
Uganda A' international footballers